Li Jingxun (Chinese: 李靜訓, Lĭ Jìngxùn, also 李小孩, Lĭ Xiǎohái, 600-608 CE) was a 9-year-old princess of the Sui dynasty when she died in 608 CE. Her stone sarcophagus was found undisturbed in 1957 near the Old City in Xi'an, Shaanxi Province, China, at that time named Daxing (大興, "Great Prosperity") as the capital of the Sui dynasty.

Life

Li Jingxun was a granddaughter of Emperor Xuan of the Northern Zhou on her maternal side, and was raised by her maternal grandmother, Empress Xuan, herself daughter of Yang Jian who later usurped the Northern Zhou throne to become the Emperor Wen of Sui. 

On her paternal side, she descended from a line of Northern Zhou generals. The tomb of her paternal great-grandfather, the Northern Zhou general Li Xian (北周李賢墓), has also been discovered, and the epitaph suggest that he was a Tuoba-Xianbei. His tomb contained several Central Asian objects too, such as an ewer with Greco-Roman scenes. 

Li Jingxun was therefore of fairly mixed ethnic lineage, since the Northern Zhou were of Xianbei origin, as was her grandmother on her maternal side, and she can be considered as an "outsider princess" in the context of the Sui dynasty.

Tomb
The stone sarcophagus is in the shape of a Sui dynasty house. It is rare design, but a carved stone coffin is also known from the tomb of another princess, Princess Yongtai (684-701). Stone outer coffins were also known among non-dynastic people, such as the Sogdian officials Wirkak and Yu Hong. The sarcophagus of Li Jingxun was decorated with two engraved male and female attendants, and with painting on the inside walls of the sarcophagus, which have disappeared due to moisture. 

An inscription on a tile of the sculpted gabled roof of the sarcophagus reads: "Open this sarcophagus, and you will die immediately" (Chinese: 開棺即死).

Epitaph
The epitaph reads:

Tomb objects
Her lavish tomb contained around 350 objects, including many artifacts from the Silk Road, and foreign-style objects. The tomb included gold cups, jades, porcelains and toys, as well as a coin of the Sasanian Emperor Peroz I (459-483 CE). Still, the tomb is considered as relatively modest by imperial standards.

It is thought that the tomb artifacts reflect her northern ethnic background. Such stone sarcophagy are related to the tradition of Sogdian tombs in China, such as the tomb of Shi Jun. In comparison, other known Sui dynasty tombs have relatively few exotic items in them.

Ancestry
Li Jingxun had an illustrious imperial and military lineage:

External links
 Excavated objects from the tomb of Li Jingxun

References

600 births
608 deaths
Sui dynasty people